The 1873 Gloucester by-election was fought on 8 May 1873[20 3].  The byelection was fought due to the Resignation of the incumbent MP of the Liberal Party, William Philip Price.  It was won by the Conservative candidate William Killigrew Wait.

References

1873 elections in the United Kingdom
1873 in England
19th century in Gloucestershire
Politics of Gloucester
By-elections to the Parliament of the United Kingdom in Gloucestershire constituencies